The USSR produced three models of dive bomber during World War II. Soviet dive bomber may refer to:

 Petlyakov Pe-2
 Petlyakov Pe-3
 Petlyakov Pe-8